John William Price (9 June 1900 – 3 November 1984) was an English professional footballer who played in the Football League in the 1920s for Bristol Rovers, Swindon Town, Brentford and Torquay United. He played as a full back.

Family
His younger brother Fred was also a footballer, who played at outside left for Leicester City, Southampton, Wolverhampton Wanderers  and  Chesterfield, whilst his uncle Cliff Price played at inside left for Leicester Fosse, Halifax Town, Southampton and Nottingham Forest.

References

1900 births
1984 deaths
People from Ibstock
Footballers from Leicestershire
English footballers
Association football fullbacks
Leicester City F.C. players
Bristol Rovers F.C. players
Swindon Town F.C. players
Brentford F.C. players
Torquay United F.C. players
English Football League players